The Economy Museum - Royal Coin Cabinet is a museum in central Stockholm, Sweden, dedicated to the history of money and economic history in general.

Function 
The Economy Museum is an institution with a national responsibility for the conservation and the historical studies of coins, medals, and finance in general. Through expositions, the institution offers insights in the economical history of the world; by lending objects from its collection to researchers and expositions all over the world, it helps develop the knowledge within its scope; and by maintaining a national register of coin hoards, it is of great importance to scholars in Sweden.  Over the portal is a piece of art by Elisabeth Ekstrand from 1996 called Vattenporfyrlek ("Water Porphyry Game") made of porphyry and marble. The museum includes exhibitions of coins, banknotes (the first in the world was issued in 1661 by Stockholms Banco), treasure hoards and piggy banks.

History 
The Economy Museum's collection dates back to around 1572 when  began collecting old Swedish coins. Over the next few centuries, the royal collection grew with donations from royals.

In 1786, the Royal Academy of Letters was established and took ownership of the collection. In 1846, the collection was exhibited publicly for this first time at the Ridderstolp House at Skeppsbron. In 1865, the Royal Coin Cabinet collections was moved into the National Historical Museum. The collection was exhibited there until it moved to another building in Östermalm between 1938 and 1948. From 1899 to 1929, numismatist Rosa Norström expanded the collections.

In 1996, the museum was moved to Slottsbacken in Stockholm's Old Town. It changed its name from "Royal Coin Cabinet – The National Museum of Coin, Medal and Monetary History" to "Royal Coin Cabinet – National Museum of Economy." In 2017, the museum closed and, in 2019, reopened in the Swedish History Museum's building.

Theft 
In 2013, the museum discovered that it was missing items from its collections. After launching a police investigation and taking inventory, they found that 1,200 objects with a reported value of 25 million SEK were missing. The museum's last audit had been conducted in 1997 when the museum moved to its location in Old Town.

In 2017, a former curator of the museum was sentenced to three years in prison for stealing and selling items from the Royal Coin Cabinet and Museum of Gothenburg. In 2020, another former employee was acquitted for the possession of stolen coins. The man had sold about 200 coins but prosecutors could not prove that they were stolen from the museum. The ruling was upheld on appeal because the prosecutors could not prove the acts were not statue barred. 11 items were confiscated during the 2017 indictment and returned to the museum.

Notable collections 
The oldest Swedish coin
Parts of the Lohe treasure found in 1937 in Gamla Stan 
Weimar Republic inflation currency
Nobel Prize medals

See also
 List of museums in Stockholm
 Swedish History Museum

References

External links

Official site in English

Museums in Stockholm
National museums of Sweden
Numismatic museums in Sweden
Organizations based in Sweden with royal patronage